Carlos Roberto Elías Galliani (born March 23, 1988, in Callao) is a Peruvian footballer who plays as a forward for Alfonso Ugarte de Puno.

Elías played for Peru at the 2005 FIFA U-17 World Championship in Peru.

Career
In January 2020, Elías moved to Alfonso Ugarte de Puno.

Honours

Club 
 Sport Boys:
 Peruvian Second Division: 2009

References

External links

1988 births
Living people
Sportspeople from Callao
Peruvian footballers
Club Alianza Lima footballers
Atlético Minero footballers
Sport Boys footballers
León de Huánuco footballers
Cienciano footballers
Los Caimanes footballers
Academia Deportiva Cantolao players
Alianza Universidad footballers
Alfonso Ugarte de Puno players
Peruvian Primera División players
Peruvian Segunda División players
Association football forwards